A numismatist is a specialist, researcher, and/or well-informed collector of numismatics/coins ("of coins"; from Late Latin numismatis, genitive of numisma). Numismatists can include collectors, specialist dealers, and scholar-researchers who use coins (and possibly, other currency) in object-based research. Although use of the term numismatics was first recorded in English in 1799, people had been collecting and studying coins long before then all over the world. (The branch of numismatics that deals with the study and collection of paper currency and banknotes by notaphilists is called Notaphily)

The first group chiefly may derive pleasure from the simple ownership of monetary devices and studying these coins as private amateur scholars. In the classical field, amateur collector studies have achieved quite remarkable progress in the field. Examples include Walter Breen, a noted numismatist who was not an avid collector, and King Farouk I of Egypt was an avid collector who had very little interest in numismatics. Harry Bass by comparison was a noted collector who was also a numismatist.

The second group are the coin dealers. Often called professional numismatists, they authenticate or grade coins for commercial purposes. The buying and selling of coin collections by numismatists who are professional dealers advance the study of money, and expert numismatists are consulted by historians, museum curators, and archaeologists. See, for example, the International Association of Professional Numismatists (IAPN) and the British Numismatic Trade Association (BNTA).

The third category are scholar numismatists working in public collections, universities or as independent scholars acquiring knowledge about monetary devices, their systems, their economy and their historical context.  Coins are especially relevant as a source in the pre-modern period.

Training and recognition 
There are very few academic institutions around the world that offer formal training in numismatics. Some may offer numismatics as part of a course in classical studies, ancient history, history or archaeology. Scholar numismatists may focus on numismatics at the postgraduate level, where the training is more research-based. As a result, most scholar numismatists will approach numismatics from within another academic discipline (e.g. history, archaeology, ancient or modern languages, metal sciences), perhaps after attending a numismatic summer school, usually based where there is an excellent coin collection. Recognition of scholarly numismatic expertise may be in the form of a postgraduate qualification, and/or in the form of a medal awarded by a numismatic society: for example, the Medal of the Royal Numismatic Society, which may be awarded to scholar numismatists of any nationality.

Donald H. Kagin earned the first PhD in Numismatics granted in the United States in 1979.

Numismatic institutes
The Institute for Numismatics and History of Money Vienna (Austria)
Indian Institute for Research in Numismatic Studies, Nasik (India)
International Centre for Numismatic Studies, Naples (Italy)

Numismatic summer schools
 American Numismatic Association Summer Seminar
 American Numismatic Society
 British Museum
 Radboud University Nijmegen (RU) and the Netherlands Institute at Athens (NIA) Summer School

Numismatic organizations (selection) 
American Numismatic Association
American Numismatic Society
 (Spanish Numismatic Society)
British Art Medal Society
British Association of Numismatic Societies
British Numismatic Society
International Bank Note Society
International Numismatic Council organises the International Numismatic Congress, and publishes the Survey of Numismatic Research.
Israel Numismatic Society
 (Royal Dutch Numismatic Society)
Money and Medals Network (UK)
 (Berlin Numismatic Society)
Oriental Numismatic Society
 (Austrian Numismatic Society)
Royal Numismatic Society (UK)
Schweizerische Numismatische Gesellschaft/Société Suisse de Numismatique/Società Svizzera di Numismatica/Swiss Numismatic Society
Società Numismatica Italiana (Italian Numismatic Society)
Royal Numismatic Society of Belgium (Société Royale de Numismatique de Belgique)
 (French Numismatic Society)
 (Swedish Numismatic Society)

Biographical resources 
As scholar numismatists work on coins (and related objects) within their particular area of interest (e.g. a particular part of the world, a particular period of history, or a particular culture), they are often known in those fields, as well as in numismatics. Biographical resources relating specifically to numismatists include the following:
Manville, H.E., Biographical Dictionary of British and Irish Numismatics, Encyclopaedia of British Numismatics. Volume IV (London, 2009)
Smith, Pete:, American Numismatic Biographies (1992).
"Numismatic Who's Who", in Coins Weekly.
de Callataÿ, F., Portraits of Famous Numismatists who died before 1800
de Callataÿ, F., Portraits of Famous Numismatists who died after 1800
Famous Numismatists - Les grands numismates, on the International Numismatic Council webpage
Encyclopedic Dictionary of Numismatic Biographies - focus on American numismatists
Numismatics - Biographical Information, on The E-Sylum

List of scholar numismatists

 Richard Abdy
 Mikhail Abramzon
 Carmen Alfaro Asins (1952–2005)
 Andreas Alföldi (1895–1981)
 R. Alföldi
 Martin Allen (numismatist)
 Michael Alram
 Michel Amandry
 Ermanno A Arslan
 Philip Attwood
 Augusto Carlos Teixeira de Aragão
 Marion Archibald (1935–2016)
 Carmen Arnold-Biucchi
 Simone Assemani (1752–1820)
 Ernest Babelon (1854–1924)
 Churchill Babington
 Paul Balog
 Anselmo Banduri
 Jean-Jacques Barthélemy Garde du Cabinet du roi (1754–1795)
  Pierre Bastien (1912–2010)
 Georges Bataille
 Khadijeh (Zohrer) Baseri
 G. Belloni
 Peter Berghaus (1919–2012)
 Jacob de Bie
 Mark Blackburn (1953–2011)
 Roger Bland
 Osmund Bopearachchi
 Bartolomeo Borghesi
 Howard Franklin Bowker
 Robert Bracey
 Pierre-Napoléon Breton
 Agnes Baldwin Brett
 Andrew Brown
 Guido Bruck
 Patrick Bruun
 Guillaume Budé
 Andrew Burnett
 Aleksander Bursche
 Kevin Butcher
 Herbert A. Cahn (1915–2002)
 Mando Caramessini-Oeconomides (1927–2015)
 Dario Calomino
 Ian Carradice
 Francesco Carelli
 Robert Carson (1918–2006)
 Karel Castelin
 Gabriele Lancillotto Castelli (1727–1792)
 Celestino Cavedoni
 Secondina Lorenza Cesano (1879–1973)
 Elvira Clain-Stefanelli (1914–2001)
 Joan Clarke
 Henry Cohen
 Barrie Cook
 Esprit-Marie Cousinéry (1747–1833).
 Michael Crawford
 Joe Cribb
 Sylvester Sage Crosby (1831–1914)
 M. Crusafont i Sabater
 Vesta Sarkhosh Curtis
 Hermann Dannenberg (1824–1905)
 François de Callatay
 Elena Abramovna Davidovich
 G. Demski
 Georges Depeyrot
 Amelia Dowler
 Théophile Marion Dumersan
 Joseph Hilarius Eckhel (1737–1798)
 Stephan Ladislaus Endlicher
 Elizabeth Errington
 Warren Esty
 Helen Farquhar
 Giuseppe Fiorelli
 Martin Folkes
 Julius Friedländer
 Nina Andreevna Frolova (1936–2015)
 Andrea Fulvio
 Raffaele Garrucci
 H.U. Geiger
 A. Geiser
 Girish Chandra
 Shpresa Gjongecaj
 Francesco Gnecchi
 Giovanni Gorini
 Michael Grant (1914–2004) 
 Philip Grierson (1910–2006)
 Claude Gros de Boze
 P.L. Gupta (Parmeshwari Lal Gupta) (1914–2001)
 Tony Hackens
 Wolfgang Hahn
 Nicola Francesco Haym (1678–1729)
 Barclay Vincent Head (1844–1914)
 Stefan Heidemann
 David Hendin
 George Hill (1867–1948)
 Thomas Hockenhull
 Chris Howgego
 Octavian Iliescu (1919–2009)
 Lutz Ilisch
 Peter Ilisch
 Friedrich Imhoof-Blumer (1838–1920)
 Lyce Jankowski
 Kenneth Jenkins (1918–2005)
 A. Johnston
 Mark Jones (museum director)
 Hans-Jörg Kellner (1920–2015)
 John Kent (1928–2000)
 Ryszard Kiersnowski (1925–2006)
 Ulrich Klein
 Koray Konuk
 Andrzej Kunisz
 Jean Lafaurie (1914–2008)
 Georges Le Rider (1928–2014)
 Ivar Leimus
 Nicholas Lowick
 George MacDonald (1862–1940)
 Dorota Malarczyk
 Brita Malmer (1925–2013)
 Joel L. Malter
 Harold Mattingly
 Nicholas Mayhew
 Andrew Meadows
 Tony Merson (1950–2016)
 Ya'akov Meshorer (1935–2004)
 Michael Metcalf
 William Metcalf
 Vincenco Mirabella (1570–1624)
 Jens-Christian Moesgaard
 Theodor Mommsen
 T. Sam N. Moorhead
 Cécile Morrisson
 B. N. Mukherjee (1932–2013)
 A. K. Narain (1925–2013)
 Edward T. Newell
 Eric P. Newman
 Rosa Norström
 Ernest Oberlaender
 Carlo Ottavio, Count Castiglione
 Bernhard Overbeck (1942–2018)
 Filippo Paruta (–1629)
 Vasiliki Penna (1951–2018)
 Pippa Pearce
 Elizabeth Pirie
 Arent Pol
 Adrian Popescu
 
 Vsevolod M. Potin (1918–2005)
 Constantin Preda (1925–2008)
 Martin Price (numismatist)
 P.P. Ripolles
 Louis Robert
 Anne Strachan Robertson (1910–1997)
 Desiré-Raoul Rochette
 A. Rovelli
 Joaquín Rubio y Muñoz
 Eduard Rüppell
 Andrea Saccoci
 Antonio Salinas
 Simone Scheers
 Gustave Schlumberger
 Edith Schönert-Geiß
 Dietrich W.H. Schwarz (1913–2000)https://www.inc-cin.org/obituaries.html
 Jirí Sejbal (1929–2004)
 Charles Seltman
 Camillo Serafini
 Jules Silvestre (1841–1918)
 Adolf Soetbeer
 Dmitry Sontsov
 Frederic Soret
 Attilo Stazio (1923–2010)
 Johann Gustav Stickel
 Stanislaw Suchodolski
 Charles Surasky
 Ioannis Svoronos (1863–1922)
 Francois Thierry (numismatist)
 Rudi Thomsen (1918–2004)
 
 Victor Tourneur
 Lucia Travaini
 Oluf Gerhard Tychsen
 Leandre Villaronga i Garriga (1919–2015)
 Johan van Heesch
 Dorothy B. Waage
 Helen Wang
 Raymond Weiller
 Gareth Williams
 Yordanka Youroukova
 Benedikt Zaech
 Jörgen Zoega
 Mohit Kapoor
 Alexander Nikolaevich Zograf

See also
List of coin collectors

References